Arpon may refer to:

 ArpON, a computer software project
 María Elena Arpón (born 1948), Spanish actress
 Óscar Arpón (born 1975), Spanish former footballer
 Rodolfo Arpon (born 1944), Filipino boxer

Spanish-language surnames